James Meek (born 1962) is a British novelist and journalist, author of The People's Act of Love. He was born in London, England, and grew up in Dundee, Scotland.

Biography

Meek attended school at Grove Academy in Broughty Ferry, Dundee, and studied at Edinburgh University. His first short stories were published in the New Edinburgh Review and he collaborated with Duncan McLean on a play, Faculty of Rats, which starred Angus Macfadyen.

After a few years in England Meek returned to Edinburgh in 1988, where he worked for The Scotsman. The following year, his first novel, McFarlane Boils the Sea, was published. In 1990 he helped McLean set up the garage publishing house Clocktower Press.

In 1991 Meek moved to Kiev and in 1994 to Moscow. He joined the staff of The Guardian, becoming its Moscow bureau chief. In 1999 he moved to London. He left the Guardian in 2005. He is the author of five novels, two books of short stories and a book of essays about privatisation. He is a contributing editor to The London Review of Books.

Fiction

In the 1990s and early 2000s Meek was associated with the emerging experimental realist school of Scottish writers, including Irvine Welsh and Alan Warner, appearing with them on the pages of the Kevin Williamson-edited short story collection Children of Albion Rovers. His fiction during this time – two novels and two books of short stories – was characterised by surrealism and absurdism and influenced by writers such as Franz Kafka and James Kelman. Meek has described it as 'magical dirty realism'.

Meek’s third novel, The People’s Act of Love, published in 2005, brought him critical acclaim and a wider audience. It was translated into more than twenty languages and earned a number of awards and a nomination for the Booker Prize. Newsweek magazine named it one of the top ten works of fiction of the 2000s. Johnny Depp optioned the book for a film adaptation.

The People's Act of Love, about a woman and her three lovers in a small Siberian town during the Russian Civil War, was followed by We Are Now Beginning Our Descent (2008), the story of a journalist who travels to Afghanistan immediately after 9/11, and The Heart Broke In (2012), set in contemporary Britain, where a newspaper editor blackmails a TV producer into betraying his sister.

Journalism

Besides reporting on Britain and the former Soviet Union, Meek covered the military conflicts in Afghanistan and Iraq after 9/11. In 2003 he crossed the border from Kuwait into Iraq, following the invading American armies to Baghdad in a small group of journalists that included Dexter Filkins.

In 2014 Meek published Private Island, a collection of essays, mainly from the London Review of Books, about the privatisation of Britain.

Awards and honours: Fiction

2005 Scottish Arts Council Book of Year Award, The People's Act of Love 
2005 Ondaatje Prize, The People’s Act of Love
2005 Booker Prize, long list, The People's Act of Love
2008 Le Prince Maurice Prize, We Are Now Beginning Our Descent
2012 Costa Book Award, shortlist, The Heart Broke In

Awards and honours: Non-fiction
2002 Reuters-IUCN Media Award
2003 British Press Awards Foreign Reporter of the Year
2004 Amnesty International Journalist of the Year
2015 Orwell Prize

Bibliography

 To Calais, In Ordinary Time (Canongate, 2019) 
 Dreams of Leaving and Remaining (Verso, 2019) 
 Private Island. Why Britain Now Belongs to Someone Else (Verso, 2014) 
 The Heart Broke In (Canongate, 2012) 
 We Are Now Beginning Our Descent (Canongate, 2008) 
 The People's Act of Love (Canongate, 2005) 
 The Museum of Doubt (Rebel Inc, 2000) 
 Drivetime (Polygon, 1995) 
 Last Orders and Other Stories (Polygon, 1992) 
 McFarlane Boils the Sea (Polygon, 1989)

Translations
Czech
 Sibiřské drama: syrový milostný příběh z období ruské revoluce, 2006, 

Danish
  I kærlighedens navn, 2005, 

Dutch
 Uit liefde van het volk
 Het hart viel binnen, 2013

French
 Nous commençons notre descente, translation David Fauquemberg, Métaillé 2008 
 Un acte d'amour, translation David Fauquemberg, Métaillé 2007 
 Thé à l'eau de mer (McFarlane Boils the Sea), translation Fanchita Gonzalez Battle, Autrement, 1997 

German
 Die einsamen Schrecken der Liebe, 2005, 
 Liebe und andere Parasiten, 2013, 

Hungarian
 A szeretet hírmondói, 2008, 

Italian
 Per amore del popolo, 2005, 
Norwegian
 Kjærlighetens utposter, 2007
Portuguese
 O Acto de Amor do Povo, 2006
Romanian
 Un gest de iubire, 2007, 
Serbian
 Narodna deklaracija ljubavi, 2007
Spanish
 Por amor al pueblo
Swedish
 Den yttersta kärlekens gulag, 2006

Notes

External links
 The People's Act of Love by James Meek (author interview)
 Interview With James Meek (author interview)
 PRX (radio interview from Radio Netherlands, English)
 James Meek: Die einsamen Schrecken der Liebe. Roman - Perlentaucher (press reviews, German)
 Das Grau, das Grau - WELT (review in Die Welt, German)
  (review in Het Parool, Dutch)
 Idealisme en extremisme in 'Uit liefde van het volk' van James Meek - Woorden en dromen (review, Dutch)

20th-century British novelists
21st-century British novelists
British male journalists
Living people
1962 births
Alumni of the University of Edinburgh
British male novelists
20th-century British male writers
21st-century British male writers